Jerry Uyami Dalipog a Filipino politician from the province of Banaue, Ifugao in the Philippines. He is the current governor of Ifugao Province in the Philippine Cordillera Region. Previously, he was the municipal mayor of Banaue from 2016 to 2019.

References

External links
Province of Banaue Official Website

Living people
1964 births
People from Ifugao
PDP–Laban politicians